In computing, dir (directory) is a command in various computer operating systems used for computer file and directory listing. It is one of the basic commands to help navigate the file system. The command is usually implemented as an internal command in the command-line interpreter (shell). On some systems, a more graphical representation of the directory structure can be displayed using the tree command.

Implementations

The command is available in the command-line interface (CLI) of the operating systems Digital Research CP/M, MP/M, Intel ISIS-II, iRMX 86, Cromemco CDOS, MetaComCo TRIPOS, DOS, IBM/Toshiba 4690 OS, IBM OS/2, Microsoft Windows, Singularity, Datalight ROM-DOS, ReactOS, GNU, AROS and in the DCL command-line interface used on DEC VMS, RT-11 and RSX-11. It is also supplied with OS/8 as a CUSP (Commonly-Used System Program).

The dir command is supported by Tim Paterson's SCP 86-DOS. On MS-DOS, the command is available in versions 1 and later. It is also available in the open source MS-DOS emulator DOSBox. MS-DOS prompts "Abort, Retry, Fail?" after being commanded to list a directory with no diskette in the drive.

The numerical computing environments MATLAB and GNU Octave include a dir 
function with similar functionality.

Examples

DOS, Windows, ReactOS
List all files and directories in the current working directory.
 dir

List any text files and batch files (filename extension ".txt" or ".bat").
 dir *.txt *.bat

Recursively list all files and directories in the specified directory and any subdirectories, in wide format, pausing after each screen of output. The directory name is enclosed in double-quotes, to prevent it from being interpreted is as two separate command-line options because it contains a whitespace character.
 dir /s /w /p "C:\My Documents"

List any NTFS junction points:
 C:\Users>dir /ash
 Volume in drive C is OS.
 Volume Serial Number is xxxx-xxxx
 Directory of C:\Users
 12/07/2019  02:30 AM    <SYMLINKD>     All Users [C:\ProgramData]
 12/07/2019  02:30 AM    <JUNCTION>     Default User [C:\Users\Default]
 12/07/2019  02:12 AM               174 desktop.ini
               1 File(s)            174 bytes
               2 Dir(s)  332,659,789,824 bytes free

Unices
dir is not a Unix command; Unix has the analogous ls command instead. The GNU operating system, however, has a dir command that "is equivalent to ls -C -b; that is, by default files are listed in columns, sorted vertically, and special characters are represented by backslash escape sequences". Actually, for compatibility reasons, ls produces device-dependent output. The dir instruction, unlike ls -Cb, produces device-independent output.

See also
Directory (OpenVMS command)
List of DOS commands
ls (corresponding command for *nix systems)

References

Further reading

External links

dir | Microsoft Docs
Open source DIR implementation that comes with MS-DOS v2.0
Dir command syntax and examples

CP/M commands
Internal DOS commands
Microcomputer software
Microsoft free software
MSX-DOS commands
OS/2 commands
ReactOS commands
Windows commands
Windows administration